The Chicago Medical Society is the medical society for Cook County, Illinois, United States. It was founded in 1850.

History
The society was founded in 1850 and is one of the oldest medical societies in the United States. The first president was Levi Boone who also served as the mayor of Chicago. It began to publish the Chicago Medical Recorder in 1891, its papers having previously been published in the journals of other medical societies. Among the notable papers published in the journal is Dr. James G. Kiernan's, "Responsibility in Sexual Perversion".

References

Further reading
 Nevins, H. J. (1876) Early medical Chicago: An Historical Sketch of the First Practitioners of Medicine in the City. Chicago: W. R. Keen, Cook & Co.

1850 establishments in Illinois
Medical associations based in the United States
Medicine in Chicago